The Lake Sun is a semi-weekly newspaper, with Wednesday and Friday editions, published in Osage Beach, Missouri, United States, covering the Lake of the Ozarks region. It is owned by Vernon Publishing.

In addition to Osage Beach, the newspaper also covers Camden, Miller, and Morgan Counties as well as the cities of Camdenton, Climax Springs, Eldon, Lake Ozark, Laurie, Linn Creek, Macks Creek, Sunrise Beach, Versailles, and Village of Four Seasons.

The Lake Sun is the flagship publication of Lake Media. Other Lake Media publications include Lake Lifestyles magazine, Vacation News, and local real estate, boating and holiday guides, among others.

External links 
 
Newspapers published in Missouri
Camden County, Missouri
Miller County, Missouri
Morgan County, Missouri
Lake of the Ozarks